Ralph Alvin Heywood (September 11, 1921 – April 10, 2007) was an American American football player.  He played college football at University of Southern California (USC) and professionally in the National Football League (NFL) and the All-America Football Conference (AFC). He, along with Harry Marker, are the only NFL players to serve in World War II, the Korean War, and the Vietnam War.

Biography
Born in Los Angeles, California, and raised during the Great Depression, Heywood received a football scholarship to attend college at the University of Southern California (USC). Despite having football scholarship, he took a job as a busboy at a sorority house, while attending USC. As two-way end, he was a captain on the 1943 USC team that finished with an 8–2 record. In his absence he was awarded an All-America honors as an end and punter in 1943, despite playing in only 5 games that season. Heywood initially enlisted in the Marine Corps in 1943 to fight in World War II. He entered the V-12 program, which was initiated to meet the increased need for Navy and Marine Corps officers, allowed him to stay in school while learning the military basics. The program allowed officer candidates to attend civilian schools while in an enlisted status in the Navy or Marine Corps. However, he was shipped off to the USS Iowa, before he had a chance to graduate. In prior years, he led the Trojans in receiving yards in 1942 and 1943, and had the school's first-ever 100-yard receiving game when he gained 101 yards on 4 receptions versus St. Mary's Pre-Flight in 1943. He also led USC in punting in 1941 and 1942.
 
After his initial discharge from the Marines following World War II, Heywood completed his degree in cinematography at USC. When he left USC for the war, he was eight units short of graduating. However, the university awarded him 10 units in military science, based on his service, allowing him to graduate. He then played for the Chicago Rockets, of the All-America Football Conferences in 1946. In 1947 he moved to the NFL, playing the next two season for the Detroit Lions. The Lions had originally selected Heywood in the 1944 NFL draft while he was still at fighting in the war. In 1948, he played for the Boston Yanks and the New York Bulldogs in 1949.

In 1952, during the Korean War, he returned to active duty. He later commanded the 26th Marine Regiment in South Vietnam. He rose to the rank of colonel and was discharged from the Marines in 1974. After retiring from active duty, Heywood became the Commandant of the Marine Military Academy, located in Harlingen, Texas. He played tennis with Charlton Heston and was a golf buddy of Bob Hope.  On August 9, 2004, Heywood made an appearance, when he delivered the game ball at the Pro Football Hall of Fame Game, between the Washington Redskins and Denver Broncos.

On April 10, 2007, Heywood died in Bandera, Texas, while laying in the arms of his wife, Suzie, as she softly sang to him. During a ceremony on January 25, 2013, he was inducted into the Marine Corps Sports Hall of Fame.

References

External links

 

1921 births
2007 deaths
American football ends
American football defensive ends
United States Marine Corps personnel of World War II
United States Marine Corps personnel of the Korean War
United States Marine Corps personnel of the Vietnam War
All-American college football players
Boston Yanks players
Chicago Rockets players
Detroit Lions players
New York Bulldogs players
People from Huntington Park, California
Players of American football from Los Angeles
United States Marine Corps colonels
USC Trojans football players
Military personnel from California